The Silvretta Glacier is a 3 km long glacier (2005) situated in the Silvretta Range in the canton of Graubünden in Switzerland. In 1973 it had an area of 3.35 km².

See also
List of glaciers in Switzerland
Swiss Alps

External links
Swiss glacier monitoring network

Glaciers of Graubünden
Glaciers of the Alps
Silvretta Alps